A yajamana is the ritual patron, on whose behalf a religious ritual or a yajna is performed by a Hindu priest, generally a Brahmin.

References

Hindu practices
Sanskrit words and phrases